Poshter Girl is a 2016 Indian Marathi-language drama film directed by Sameer Patil. Scripted by Hemant Dhome, the film was produced by Chalo Film Banaye and Viacom18 Motion Pictures, and stars Sonalee Kulkarni, Jitendra Joshi, Hrishikesh Joshi, Aniket Vishwasrao, Hemant Dhome, Siddharth Menon, Sandeep Pathak, Akshay Tanksale, Anand Ingale and Vaibhav Mangale. The film was released on 12 February 2016.

Plot
Poshter Girl takes the viewer on a mad roller coaster ride of a quaint, little village in Maharashtra - Paragao-Tekawde. There are no girls left in the village. When the question of boys' marriage arises, a beautiful and intelligent girl enters the scenario and changes everything. This is the story of the girl Rupali and her chosen five candidates who would do anything to win her heart.

Cast
 Sonalee Kulkarni as Rupali Thorat
 Jitendra Joshi as Bharatrao Zende
 Hrishikesh Joshi as Kisanrao Thorat
 Aniket Vishwasrao as Bajrang Dudhbhate
 Hemant Dhome as Suraj
 Sandeep Pathak as Suresh Yadgaokar Patil
 Siddharth Menon as Arjun Kalal
 Neha Shitole as Kisanrao's Wife
Rasika Sunil as Sangita (Lavani Dancer) 
 Akshay Tanksale as Ramesh Yadgaokar Patil
 Anand ingale
 Vaibhav Mangale
 Pratibha Bhagat as Rupali's mother

Track listing

Vocalist Anand Shinde, sang a song for the first time professionally with his son Adarsh Shinde.

References

External links
 

2016 films
Indian drama films
2010s Marathi-language films